William John Melvin (born 22 June 1977) is a former Scottish footballer who played for Clydebank and Dumbarton.

References

1977 births
Scottish footballers
Dumbarton F.C. players
Clydebank F.C. (1965) players
Scottish Football League players
Living people
Association football midfielders
Glasgow United F.C. players
Scottish Junior Football Association players